Tracazolate (ICI-136,753) is an anxiolytic drug which is used in scientific research. It is a pyrazolopyridine derivative, most closely related to pyrazolopyrimidine drugs such as zaleplon, and is one of a structurally diverse group of drugs known as the nonbenzodiazepines which act at the same receptor targets as benzodiazepines but have distinct chemical structures.

Tracazolate has primarily anxiolytic and anticonvulsant effects, with sedative and muscle relaxant effects only appearing at higher doses. It has a unique receptor binding profile involving allosteric modulation of several GABAA receptor subtypes, being selective for GABAA receptors containing α1 and β3 subunits, but exhibiting different effects depending on the third type of subunit making up the receptor complex.

See also 
 Cartazolate
 ICI-190,622
 Etazolate

References 

Adenosine receptor antagonists
Anticonvulsants
Anxiolytics
Carboxylate esters
Ethyl esters
GABAA receptor positive allosteric modulators
Pyrazolopyridines
Butyl compounds